Ernst Fuchs (27 December 1936 – 15 September 1994) was a Swiss racing cyclist. He was the Swiss National Road Race champion in 1961.

References

External links
 

1936 births
1994 deaths
Swiss male cyclists
Sportspeople from the canton of St. Gallen